The Parachute Ranger School (FJS), is the Swedish Army's paratrooper ranger school and the home of Fallskärmsjägarna (Parachute Rangers) and Särskilda operationsgruppen (Special Operations Group). The school was founded in 1952 by captain Nils-Ivar Carlborg with the intention of creating and training small specialized units no bigger than platoons which were capable of operating deep behind enemy lines and inside enemy-controlled territory. Training is provided for both normal and static line jumps using the C-130 Hercules aircraft, as well as nighttime jumps, free fall jumps, HALO and HAHO. The school was reorganized into the 323rd Parachute Ranger Company in 2009.

History
The Parachute Ranger School was founded as the Swedish Army Parachute Ranger School (Arméns fallskärmsjägarskola) in 1952 by then captain Nils-Ivar Carlborg. The task was to use small platoon-sized units to penetrate and disrupt the enemy. The mode of transport was the airplane and at low altitude the parachute to get as far as possible behind enemy lines. The unit was initially a part of Karlsborg Anti-Aircraft Regiment (Lv 1). When the Karlsborg Anti-Aircraft Regiment was disbanded in 1961, the unit came to be subordinate to the commanding officer of Göta Signal Regiment (S 2).

The Parachute Ranger School was until 1978 located in the "Parachute Ranger Camp" (Fallskärmsjägarlägret), which until 1951 was the camp (barracks) ("Gamla lägret") of the Second Quartermaster Company (Andra intendenturkompaniet, Int 2) at Vätterstranden in Karlsborg. In 1978 the operations were moved to Slutvärnet at Karlsborg Fortress.

In connection with the 1982 Defense Bill, the Life Regiment Hussars (K 3) was relocated from Skövde Garrison to Karlsborg Garrison. This change meant that both the Parachute Ranger School and the Göta Signal Regiment became subordinate to the commanding officer of the Life Regiment Hussars. The Göta Signal Regiment was subsumed in the Life Regiment Hussars as a signal battalion and the Parachute Ranger School as a school unit.

On 1 July 1994, the formal designation was changed to the Parachute Ranger Corps (Fallskärmsjägarkåren), but the abbreviation FJS survived. The name was then changed again to the Parachute Ranger School (Fallskärmsjägarskolan), and in 2005 the school became a part of the Swedish Armed Forces Special Forces (Försvarsmaktens specialförband, FM SF).

In 2007 the school was split so that the operations part remained in the special forces system while the training company and the parachute division became subordinate to the Life Regiment Hussars. The Parachute Ranger School was discontinued in 2009, and was reorganized into the 323rd Parachute Ranger Company, 32nd Intelligence Battalion (323. Fallskärmsjägarkompaniet, 32. Underrättelsebataljonen), which also carry on the traditions of the Parachute Ranger School. Internally, the school's heraldic arms is used by the company.

Current activities
The school is currently responsible for all parachute training within the Swedish Armed Forces. Since the 1980s, FJS became more focused on training units focused on long range reconnaissance which is the parachute rangers' main objective today. The school also trains the elite force Särskilda operationsgruppen - Special Operations Group which is an equivalent of the US Delta Force and British 22 SAS - only part of their training is provided by FJS.

Heraldry and traditions

Colours, standards and guidons
The Swedish Parachute Ranger School presents one colour. It was drawn by Ingrid Lamby and Kristina Holmgård-Åkerberg and embroidered by machine in appliqué technique by Engelbrektsson Flag factory. The colour was presented to the then Parachute Ranger Training Corps (FJS) at the Artillery Yard in Stockholm by the Supreme Commander, general Owe Wiktorin on 30 April 1996. It was used as corps colour by FJS until 1 July 2000. The colour may be used according to the decisions of CO K 3. Blazon: "On wine red cloth the badge of the school; a spread-out parachute with five cords inside an open chaplet of laurels and in the second and fourth corners the year 1952 divided with two figures in each corner, all yellow."

Coat of arms
The coat of the arms of the Swedish Army Paratroop School (FJS) 1952–1994. Blazon: "Azure, a spread-out parachute with five cords inside an open chaplet of laurel, all or." The coat of arms of the Swedish Paratrooper Training Corps (FJS) 1994–2000 and the Swedish Parachute Ranger School since 2000. Blazon: "Purple, a spread-out parachute with five cords inside an open chaplet of laurel, all or".

Medals
In 2007, the Fallskärmsjägarskolans förtjänstmedalj ("Swedish Parachute Ranger School Medal of Merit") in gold and silver (FJSGM/SM) of the 8th size was established. The medalj ribbon is of purple moiré with a yellow stripe on each side.

Other
Since 2009, the 323rd Parachute Ranger Company (323. fallskärmsjägarkompaniet) continues the traditions of the Swedish Parachute Ranger School. Internally, the school's heraldic arms is used by the company.

Commanding officers

1952–1953: Nils-Ivar Carlborg
1953–1954: Nils Engelheart
1954–1957: Torsten Nordin
1957–1959: Carl-Olof Wrang
1959–1961: Lars-Erik Sjöström
1961–1962: Magnus Eriksson
1962–1966: Rolf Lundkvist
1966–1971: Magnus Eriksson
1971–1982: Torbjörn Elming
1982–1987: Åke Thörnesjö
1987–1989: Anders Kihl
1989–1990: Rolf Käck
1990–1992: Svante Andersson
1992–1995: Anders Gerhard Lilliestierna
1995–1998: Lars G Ericsson
1998–2000: Björn Olsson
2000–2007: Bo Sköld
2007–2009: Thomas Hagman

Names, designations and locations

See also
 Fallskärmsjägarna
 Särskilda operationsgruppen - SOG
 Särskilda Skyddsgruppen - SSG
 Särskilda Inhämtningsgruppen - SIG

Footnotes

References

Notes

Print

Further reading

Special forces of Sweden
1952 establishments in Sweden
2009 disestablishments in Sweden
Military units and formations established in 1952
Military units and formations disestablished in 2009
Disbanded units and formations of Sweden
Defunct schools in Sweden
Military education and training in Sweden
Karlsborg Garrison